

Hunberght (or Hunbeorht; died c. 833) was a medieval Bishop of Lichfield.

Hunberght was consecrated in 830 and died sometime between 830 and 836.

Citations

References

External links
 

830s deaths
9th-century English bishops
Anglo-Saxon bishops of Lichfield
Year of birth unknown